Aronson is a surname. Notable people with the surname include:

 Billy Aronson, American playwright
 Boris Aronson (1898–1980), American artist and set designer
 Chaim Aronson (1825–1893), Lithuanian inventor and memoirist in Tsarist Russia
 Elaine Aronson, American television writer and producer
 Elliot Aronson, American psychologist
 Eva Aronson (1908–1999), American chess master
 Irene Aronson (born 1918), American painter and printmaker
 James Aronson (1915–1988), American journalist
 Jan Aronson, American artist
 Dr. Jason Aronson, American psychologist and founder of Jason Aronson publishing
 J. Hugo Aronson (1891–1978), American politician
 Joshua Aronson, American psychologist
 Judie Aronson, American actress
 Letty Aronson, American film producer, sister of Woody Allen
 Marita Aronson, Swedish politician
 Max Aronson, birth name of American film actor Broncho Billy Anderson (1880–1971)
 Shlomo Aronson (disambiguation), multiple people
 Stanisław Aronson, officer of the Polish Home Army and Israeli Defense Force 
 Stina Aronson (1892–1956), Swedish writer
 Theo Aronson (1929–2003), South Africa-born biographer of English royals
 Naoum Aronson (1874–1943), Russian-born sculptor who worked mostly in France
 Raney Aronson-Rath, American documentary filmmaker and television producer

See also 
 Aaronson

Jewish surnames
Patronymic surnames